Kocsis is a Hungarian surname, from the Hungarian word kocsi (meaning coach). Kocsis in Hungarian means coachman. 

Variations to Kocsis include Kocis and Kočiš. Notable people with the surname Kocsis and variants include:

Kocsis
 Adrienn Kocsis (born 1973), Hungary-born Peruvian badminton player
Antal Kocsis (1905–1994), a Hungarian boxer
Chuck Kocsis (1913–2006), an American amateur golfer
Erzsébet Kocsis (born 1965) is a Hungarian handball player
Evelin Viktória Kocsis (born 2006), Hungarian rhythmic gymnast
Ferenc Kocsis (born 1953), a Hungarian wrestler
István Kocsis (1949–1994), a Hungarian football player
James Kocsis, professor of psychiatry at Weill Cornell Medical College and Payne Whitney Psychiatric Clinic
Lajos Kocsis (1947–2000), Hungarian footballer
Orsi Kocsis (born 1984), Hungarian model
Péter Fülöp Kocsis (born 1963), Hungarian Greek Catholic archbishop
Sándor Kocsis (1929–1979), a Hungarian footballer
Zoltán Kocsis (1952–2016), a Hungarian pianist, conductor, and composer
Kocis
Bryan Kocis (1962–2007), also known by his artistic name Bryan Phillips, gay pornographic film director and founder of the gay pornographic studio Cobra Video. 
Tereza Kočiš (born 1934), also written Tereza Košiš, Serbian gymnast and Olympian who competed for Yugoslavia

See also
Kociszew (disambiguation)

Hungarian-language surnames
Occupational surnames